The Fearing Mind is an American horror television series that aired on the Fox Family Channel from October 21 until December 2, 2000.

Premise
Bill Fearing, a famous writer of suspense thrillers, gets his ideas from things that happen in his family. When he gets an idea, the viewers enter his mind and see the gruesome events unfold.

Cast
 Harry Van Gorkum as Bill Fearing
 Susan Gibney as Cynthia Fearing
 Katee Sackhoff as Lenore Fearing
 Rae Allen as Grandma Lucy
 John Fleck as Howard

Episodes

References

External links
 

2000 American television series debuts
2000 American television series endings
2000s American horror television series
2000s American anthology television series
English-language television shows
American television shows featuring puppetry
Fox Family Channel original programming
Television series by The Jim Henson Company